Stephen Werner (born August 8, 1984) is an American former professional ice hockey player who last played for the Graz 99ers in the Austrian Hockey League (EBEL). He was selected by the Washington Capitals in the 3rd round (83rd overall) of the 2003 NHL Entry Draft.

He previously played for Augsburger Panther in the Deutsche Eishockey Liga (DEL). In the midst of the 2016–17 season, his third year with the Graz 99ers, Werner had featured in just 8 games up to the mid-point of the campaign. Limited by an ongoing concussion injury, Werner opted to announce his retirement on January 9, 2017, after 10 professional seasons.

Awards and honors

Career statistics

Regular season and playoffs

International

References

External links

1984 births
American men's ice hockey centers
Augsburger Panther players
Cincinnati Cyclones (ECHL) players
Graz 99ers players
Hershey Bears players
Ice hockey people from Washington, D.C.
Living people
Milwaukee Admirals players
South Carolina Stingrays players
Springfield Falcons players
Washington Capitals draft picks
Grizzlys Wolfsburg players
UMass Minutemen ice hockey players
USA Hockey National Team Development Program players